HYCOR Biomedical is an American corporation specializing in the manufacture and supply of in vitro diagnostic products for blood testing for allergies. The company has offices in Garden Grove, California, and Amsterdam, Netherlands. HYCOR Biomedical mainly produces tests and equipment relating to Allergy. Current equipment released by HYCOR includes the fully-automated NOVEOS Immunoanalyzer that uses only 4 microliters of sample per test, paramagnetic microparticles as a solid phase, chemiluminescence and fluorescence methodology for high sensitivity, and liquid ready-to-use reagents. The HYTEC 288 Plus EIA system continues to serve laboratories around the world. The NOVEOS system is the first BIG change in routine allergy testing in over 20 years, capturing the attention of laboratories looking to reduce interference issues that they face with other products, and those looking to improve the patient and clinician experience by reducing the amount of sample needed to perform testing.

Currently, HYCOR Biomedical has an estimated 5% market share in allergy testing, second to Thermo Fisher Scientific's ImmunoCAP and Phadia instrumentation. As the NOVEOS System launches across the globe, market share for HYCOR will increase.

Products and services
Many are familiar with a common method for allergy testing called skin prick testing. However, this method relies on examining a patient's reaction to the exposed allergen, and in some cases, invokes large systemic reactions. With a growing need for testing younger patients without putting them at risk, in vitro testing has become an increasingly more viable alternative.

References

Companies based in California
Manufacturing companies of the United States
Companies established in 1981